"Gasoline" is a song by American singer and songwriter Halsey. The track is included on the deluxe edition of her debut studio album Badlands (2015). It was written by Halsey and Lido; the latter also producing the song. Despite only being included on the deluxe edition of Badlands, it is one of the album's most popular tracks, counting more than 300 million plays on Spotify and 120 million views on YouTube.

A reproduced version of the song titled "Gasoline (Reimagined)" was included on the Target exclusive edition of Halsey's fourth studio album If I Can't Have Love, I Want Power (2021). Halsey performed this version during her virtual Moment House concert a few days after the album's release.

Background 
In an interview with Popjustice, Halsey confirmed that she submitted Badlands twelve days after expected, being the song written and produced the day the album was initially planned to be out. She described the track as self-aware, considering it a synopsis for the album and as she said, "what I thought the record was missing". She also expressed her interest in people buying the deluxe version of the record on purpose for them to get the track.

Composition 
The song is described as a "brooding electropop track." The track is written about Halsey's experience with mental health, her bipolar disorder and her feeling out of step with the rest of society.

Critical reception 
Kitty Empire from The Guardian described the track, "one of the harder-hitting songs on [...]Badlands". Tina Roumeliotis from Buzznet called the song "a crowd-pleaser" while Billboards Chris Payne considers it "a fan favourite". It has more than 300 million plays on streaming platform Spotify.

Certifications

References

2015 songs
Halsey (singer) songs
Songs about mental health
Songs written by Lido (musician)
Songs written by Halsey (singer)